James Victor Dixon (March 5, 1904 – June 8, 1966) was an American football player, wrestler and coach. He played college football at the tackle position for Oregon State University from 1924 to 1926 and was selected as a second-team player by Davis J. Walsh of the International News Service for his 1926 College Football All-America Team.  Dixon later served as an assistant football coach at Oregon State from 1933 to 1947 and as the head wrestling coach from 1934 to 1938 and 1952 to 1955. The Dixon Recreation Center on Oregon State's campus is named for him.  Dixon has been inducted into the Oregon Sports Hall of Fame (1982) and the Oregon State Athletics Hall of Fame (1990).

References

1904 births
1966 deaths
All-American college football players
American football tackles
Oregon State Beavers football players
Oregon State Beavers football coaches
Players of American football from Washington (state)
Sportspeople from Yakima, Washington
Oregon State Beavers wrestling coaches